Young Blood    is a 2019 Chinese television series directed by Yi Zheng and Wang Juan, that aired on Hunan TV from 3 June 2019 to 17 July 2019 for 42 episodes. The series wrapped up filming in July 2018.

Plot 
Six youths of different backgrounds come together to form a team of top elite spies of the Northern Song Dynasty.

Cast
Zhang Xincheng as Yuan Zhongxin
Zhou Yutong as Zhao Jian
Wang Youshuo as Wang Kuan
Zheng Wei as Xue Ying
Su Xiaotong as Pei Jing
Bruce Hung as Wei Yanei
Tong Fan as Lu Guannian 
Gao Ziqi as Yuan Boqi
Marco Lo as Han Duanzhang
Yan Xiao as Ding Er
Liu Meihan as Yun Ni 
Li Xiaochuan as Lao Zei
Sui Yongliang as Liang Zhu
Wang Zheng as Qin Wuya

Soundtrack

Reception
The drama received positive reviews for transmitting positive values of loving your country and chasing your dreams. It received praise for its unexpected plot twists and interesting characters. It received a score of 8.2 on Douban.

Award and nominations

References

External links
 Young Blood on Weibo
 Young Blood on Douban

Chinese historical television series
Television series by Huace Media
2019 Chinese television series debuts
2019 Chinese television series endings
Hunan Television dramas